Campylomma is a genus of bugs in the family Miridae and tribe Nasocorini.

Species
The following are included in BioLib.cz:

 Campylomma acaciae Linnavuori, 1961
 Campylomma adamsoni Knight, 1938
 Campylomma admittens Linnavuori, 1975
 Campylomma angustulum Reuter, 1904
 Campylomma annulicorne (Signoret, 1865)
 Campylomma atripes Linnavuori, 1986
 Campylomma austrina Malipatil, 1992
 Campylomma boharti Carvalho, 1956
 Campylomma boninense Carvalho, 1956
 Campylomma breviata Knight, 1938
 Campylomma buddlejae Duwal, Yasunaga & Lee, 2010
 Campylomma cardini Barber & Bruner, 1946
 Campylomma celatum Wagner, 1969
 Campylomma chichijima Carvalho, 1956
 Campylomma chinense Schuh, 1984
 Campylomma chitwanense Duwal, Yasunaga & Lee, 2010
 Campylomma citrinella Odhiambo, 1960
 Campylomma citrinum Carvalho, 1968
 Campylomma cuneolata Knight, 1938
 Campylomma diversicorne Reuter, 1878
 Campylomma eurycephalum Yasunaga, 2001
 Campylomma fallaciosa Linnavuori & Al-Safadi, 1993
 Campylomma fopingensis X.M. Li & G.Q. Liu, 2010
 Campylomma fusca Knight, 1938
 Campylomma fusciantennata Malipatil, 1992
 Campylomma fuscicorne Reuter, 1899
 Campylomma grandis Linnavuori, 1986
 Campylomma hawaiiensis Usinger, 1942
 Campylomma hestia Linnavuori & Van Harten, 2001
 Campylomma hilaris Linnavuori, 1975
 Campylomma hivaoae Knight, 1938
 Campylomma incerta Villiers, 1956
 Campylomma irianica Schuh, 1984
 Campylomma kalliope Linnavuori, 1989
 Campylomma khuzestanicum Linnavuori, 2010
 Campylomma koraticola Yasunaga & Duwal, 2015
 Campylomma kununurraensis Malipatil, 1992
 Campylomma leptadeniae Linnavuori, 1975
 Campylomma leucochilum Reuter, 1905
 Campylomma liebknechti Girault, 1934 (apple dimpling bug)
 Campylomma lindbergi Hoberlandt, 1953
 Campylomma livida Reuter, 1885
 Campylomma lividicornis Reuter, 1912
 Campylomma lividum Reuter, 1885
 Campylomma longirostris Knight, 1938
 Campylomma luteola Knight, 1938
 Campylomma luzonica Schuh, 1984
 Campylomma marjorae Schuh, 1984
 Campylomma marmorosa Schuh, 1984
 Campylomma marquesana Knight, 1938
 Campylomma minima Wagner, 1960
 Campylomma minuenda Knight, 1938
 Campylomma minutum (Linnavuori, 1975)
 Campylomma miyamotoi Yasunaga, 2001
 Campylomma monticola Poppius, 1914
 Campylomma nanna Yasunaga & Duwal, 2015
 Campylomma nigra Schuh, 1984
 Campylomma nigrifemur Wagner, 1975
 Campylomma nigronasutum Reuter, 1878
 Campylomma novocaledonica Schuh, 1984
 Campylomma novoirlandense Schuh, 1984
 Campylomma odhiamboi Kerzhner & Schuh, 1995
 Campylomma oertzenii Reuter, 1888
 Campylomma oreophila Linnavuori & Al-Safadi, 1993
 Campylomma papuana Schuh, 1984
 Campylomma pimai Yasunaga & Duwal, 2015
 Campylomma plantarum Lindberg, 1959
 Campylomma pulicariae Linnavuori, 1986
 Campylomma ribesi Goula, 1986
 Campylomma rivulorum Linnavuori & Al-Safadi, 1993
 Campylomma rubrotincta Knight, 1938
 Campylomma salaciella Yasunaga & Duwal, 2015
 Campylomma sandaracine Schuh, 1984
 Campylomma seminigricaput (Girault, 1934)
 Campylomma simillimum Jakovlev, 1882
 Campylomma tinctipennis Knight, 1938
 Campylomma unicolor Poppius, 1914
 Campylomma vendicarinum Carapezza, 1991
 Campylomma verbasci (Meyer-Dür, 1843) (mullein bug)
 Campylomma viridissima Linnavuori & Al-Safadi, 1993
 Campylomma viticis Lindberg, 1948

References

Further reading

 

Nasocorini